Don Nelson Laramore (December 22, 1906 – August 9, 1989) was a judge of the United States Court of Claims and later a United States Circuit Judge of the United States Court of Appeals for the Federal Circuit.

Education and career

Born on December 22, 1906, in Starke County, Indiana, Laramore attended the University of Chicago and the Indiana Law School (now the Indiana University Robert H. McKinney School of Law). He was an official court reporter for the Indiana Circuit Court for the Forty-Fourth Judicial Circuit from 1925 to 1936. He was an attorney for the claims department of the Nickel Plate Railroad, Pennsylvania Railroad and New York Central Railroad from 1936 to 1942. He was a judge of the Indiana Circuit Court for the Forty Fourth Judicial Circuit from 1942 to 1954.

Federal judicial service

Laramore was nominated by President Dwight D. Eisenhower on February 15, 1954, to a seat on the United States Court of Claims vacated by Judge George Evan Howell. He was confirmed by the United States Senate on March 16, 1954, and received his commission on March 17, 1954. He assumed senior status on January 17, 1972. Laramore was reassigned by operation of law to the United States Court of Appeals for the Federal Circuit on October 1, 1982, pursuant to 96 Stat. 25. His service terminated on August 9, 1989, due to his death in Washington, D.C.

References

Sources
 
 

1906 births
1989 deaths
Indiana state court judges
Judges of the United States Court of Claims
Judges of the United States Court of Appeals for the Federal Circuit
United States federal judges appointed by Dwight D. Eisenhower
20th-century American judges
People from Starke County, Indiana
Indiana University Robert H. McKinney School of Law alumni
University of Chicago alumni
20th-century American lawyers